The National Association of the Motion Picture Industry (NAMPI) was an American film industry self-regulatory body created by the Hollywood studios in 1916 to answer demands for film censorship by states and municipalities.

History
The system consisted of a series of "Thirteen Points", a list of subjects and storylines they promised to avoid. However, there was no method of enforcement if a studio film violated the Thirteen Points content restrictions. The NAMPI tried to prevent New York from becoming the first state with its own film censorship board in 1921, but failed. NAMPI was ineffective and was replaced when the studios hired Will H. Hays to oversee the film content restrictions in 1922.

Epidemic response
In 1918, the Association asked New York City Health Commissioner Royal S. Copeland to forward to them his observations regarding any relation between the motion picture theaters and the influenza epidemic in New York. Dr. Copeland had decided to permit the motion picture theaters to remain open.  Nonetheless, in as much as two-thirds of movie houses had been closed by local boards of health, the Association decided to halt the release of new features.

See also
Film censorship in the United States

Notes

References

Black, Gregory D. Hollywood Censored: Morality Codes, Catholics, and the Movies. Cambridge University Press 1996 
Butters, Gerard R. Banned in Kansas: Motion Picture Censorship, 1915-1966. University of Missouri Press 2007 
Doherty, Thomas Patrick. Pre-Code Hollywood: Sex, Immorality, and Insurrection in American Cinema 1930-1934. New York: Columbia University Press 1999. 
Wittern-Keller, Laura. Freedom of the Screen: Legal Challenges to State Film Censorship, 1915-1981. University Press of Kentucky 2008  

History of film
Film censorship in the United States